A channel opener, also known as a channel activator, is a type of drug which facilitates ion flow through ion channels.

They include the following:

 Potassium channel openers
 Calcium channel openers
 Sodium channel openers
 Chloride channel openers

See also 
 Channel blocker

Ion channel openers